Cheat the Gallows is the third studio album by American progressive rock/progressive metal band Bigelf.

Track listing

Personnel

Bigelf 
 Damon Fox – vocals, keyboards, string arrangements
 Ace Mark – guitar
 Duffy Snowhill – bass
 Steve Frothingham a.k.a. Froth – drums

Guest appearances 
 Linda Perry – backing vocals (on tracks 7 & 8)
 Danny "Lord Weatherby" Martin – ring leader (on track 1)
 Eric Gorfain – string arrangements

The Counting Sheep Orchestra (on tracks 1, 3, 6 & 10)
 Christopher Anderson-Bazzoli – conductor
 Daphne Chen, Terrence Glenny, Marisa Kuney, Ami Levy, Calabria McChesney, Cameron Patrick, Radu Pieptea, Melissa Reiner, Isabelle Senger, Marcy Vaj & Alwyn Wright – violins
 Caroline Buckman, Alma Fernandez, Leah Katz & David Sage – violas
 Peggy Baldwin, Matt Cooker, Richard Dodd & John Krovoza – cellos

The Section Quartet (on tracks 5 & 7)
 Eric Gorfain & Daphne Chen – violins
 Leah Katz – viola
 Richard Dodd – cello

The Kung-Pao Horns (on tracks 1, 2 & 10)
 Stewart Cole – trumpet
 James King – tenor sax, flute, piccolo
 Dan Ostermann – trombone
 Tracy Wannomae – alto sax, clarinet, bass clarinet, flute

Production 
 Produced by Damon Fox
 Engineered by Ian Lehrfeld
 Mixed by Ian Lehrfeld with Damon Fox
 Mastered by Stephen Marcussen

References 

2008 albums
Bigelf albums
Custard Records albums